Tantième (1947–1966) was a French Thoroughbred horse racing champion and prominent sire who twice won the Prix de l'Arc de Triomphe, France's most prestigious horse race. He also won several other important conditions races including the Grand Critérium in 1949, the Poule d'Essai des Poulains, Prix Lupin and his first Arc de Triomphe in 1950. Racing as a four-year-old, in 1951 Tantième won the Prix Ganay plus his second Arc de Triomphe and in England he captured the Coronation Cup.

After winning twelve of his fifteen races, Tantième was retired to stand at stud at François Dupré's Haras d'Ouilly where he became the Champion French Sire of 1962 and 1965. A few of the horses Tantième sired are:

 Tanerko (b. 1953) – In France won Grand Prix de Saint-Cloud, Prix Juigné, Prix Noailles, Prix Lupin, Prix du Prince d'Orange, Prix Ganay, Prix d'Harcourt Sire of Relko.
 Reliance (b. 1962) – In France won the 1965 Prix du Jockey Club, Grand Prix de Paris, Prix Royal-Oak.
 Match II (b. 1958) – In France won the 1961 Prix Royal-Oak, 1962 Grand Prix de Saint-Cloud. In England: 1962 King George VI and Queen Elizabeth Stakes and in the United States, the 1962 Washington, D.C. International.
 La Sega  (b. 1959) – In France won the Prix de Diane, Poule d'Essai des Pouliches, Prix Saint-Alary, Prix d'Ispahan, Prix de la Grotte.

References
 Tantième's pedigree and racing stats

1947 racehorse births
1966 racehorse deaths
Racehorses bred in Calvados (department)
Racehorses trained in France
Arc winners
Champion Thoroughbred Sires of France
Thoroughbred family 20-a
Racehorses bred in France
Chefs-de-Race